Pray for It is the third full-length album by Canadian indie rock band July Talk, released July 10, 2020 on Sleepless Records. The album won the Juno Award for Alternative Album of the Year at the Juno Awards of 2021, and Cosette Schulz's video for "Governess Shadow" was longlisted for the 2021 Prism Prize.

Track listing

References 

2020 albums
July Talk albums
Juno Award for Alternative Album of the Year albums